Crocidosema plebejana, the cotton tipworm, is a tortrix moth (family Tortricidae), belonging to tribe Eucosmini of subfamily Olethreutinae. It is found today all over the subtropical and tropical regions of the world and even occurs on many oceanic islands – in Polynesia and Saint Helena for example – but has probably been accidentally introduced to much of its current range by humans. In addition, it is also found in some cooler regions, e.g. in Europe except in the east and north; this is probably also not natural, as it was, for example, not recorded in the British Isles before 1900.

It is the type species of its genus Crocidosema, established by Philipp Christoph Zeller when he described the present species in 1847, as he found it unlike any moth then known to science.

Description and ecology
The wingspan of adults is 12–16 mm. Males are dark brown to black with a white ocellus and dorsal patch. Females are pale brown to tan with a dark basal patch that does not extend to the costa. Julius von Kennel provides a full description. 

In the seasonal parts of its range, this moth flies from midsummer to early autumn, e.g. from July to October in southern England. It is not quite clear whether there are several broods per year in the tropics, as it has been recorded on the Marquesas Islands only between January and April for example. The adults are active in the evening and are attracted to lights.

The larvae mainly feed inside the seed capsules and shoots of Malvaceae such as China jute (Abutilon theophrasti), marsh mallow (Althaea officinalis), the tree mallow (Lavatera arborea), arrowleaf sida (Sida rhombifolia), and various Gossypium (cottons) and Malva (typical mallows) species. The caterpillars have been found on other eurosids, including Crataegus hawthorns (Rosaceae), Cucurbita pepo pumpkins (Cucurbitaceae), and Eucalyptus (Myrtaceae). They may occasionally become pests of cotton.

Synonyms

This species was described time and again under different names from all over its wide range. But not even subspecies are accepted today, rendering all those other names invalid. In addition, it was variously assigned to other tortrix moth genera – usually close relatives of Crocidosema such as Epinotia (under its junior synonyms Paedisca, Proteopteryx and Steganoptycha) or Eucosma, but sometimes more distantly related Olethreutinae such as Grapholita (under the spelling variant Grapholitha) and Hedya (as Penthina, a misspelling of the junior synonym Pendina). In addition to being the type species of Crocidosema, one of these redescriptions – at that time still unrecognized as what it was – was used as late as 1965 to establish the genus Parasuleima as supposedly distinct from Crocidosema.

The invalid scientific names of this moth are:

 Crocidosema blackburnii (Butler, 1881)
 Crocidosema bostrychodes Diakonoff, 1992
 Crocidosema iris Diakonoff, 1984
 Crocidosema plebeiana (lapsus)
 Crocidosema plebiana (lapsus)
 Crocidosema ptiladelpha Meyrick, 1917
 Crocidosema synneurota Meyrick, 1926
 Eucosma charmera Turner, 1946
 Eucosma plebeiana (lapsus)
 Eucosma tornocycla Turner, 1946
 Grapholitha altheana (Mann, 1855)
 Grapholitha excitana Moschler, 1891
 Grapholitha peregrinana Moschler, 1866
 Paedisca lavaterana Milliere, 1863
 Parasuleima insulana (Aurivillius in Skottsberg, 1922)
 Penthina altheana Mann, 1855
 Proteopteryx blackburnii Butler, 1881
 Stechanoptycha altheana (lapsus)
 Steganoptycha altheana (Mann, 1855)
 Steganoptycha obscura E. Wollaston, 1879
 Steganoptycha signatana Walsingham, 1894 (non Douglas, 1845: preoccupied)

Footnotes

References

  (2010): Online World Catalogue of the Tortricidae – Crocidosema species list. Version 2.0. Retrieved 15 October 2011.
  (1986): Pyralidae and Microlepidoptera of the Marquesas Archipelago. Smithsonian Contributions to Zoology 416: 1-485. PDF fulltext  (214 MB!)
  (2009): Crocidosema plebejana. Version 2.1, 22 December 2009. Retrieved 28 September 2019.
  [2011]: UKMoths – Crocidosema plebejana Retrieved 15 October 2011.
  (2004a): Butterflies and Moths of the World, Generic Names and their Type-species – Crocidosema. Version of 5 November 2004. Retrieved 15 October 2011.
  (2004b): Butterflies and Moths of the World, Generic Names and their Type-species – Parasuleima. Version of 5 November 2004. Retrieved 15 October 2011.

Eucosmini
Moths described in 1847
Moths of Africa
Moths of Japan
Moths of Madagascar
Moths of Mauritius
Moths of New Zealand
Moths of São Tomé and Príncipe
Moths of Seychelles
Moths of Asia
Tortricidae of Europe
Taxa named by Philipp Christoph Zeller